Group Captain E. A. A. Awuviri was a Ghanaian air force personnel and served in the Ghana Air Force. He was the Chief of Air Staff of the Ghana Air Force from January 1982 to December 1982.

References

Chiefs of Air Staff (Ghana)
Ghanaian military personnel
Ghana Air Force personnel